Al Ain Football Club (transliterated: Nady al-'Ayn) or Al Ain FC or simply Al Ain is a professional football club, based in the city of Al Ain, Abu Dhabi, United Arab Emirates. It is one of many sport sections of the multi-sports club Al Ain Sports and Cultural Club Al Ain SCC for short.

The club was founded in 1968 by players from Al Ain, members of a Bahraini group of exchange students and the Sudanese community working in the United Arab Emirates. The team quickly gained popularity and recognition throughout the country, being the team with the most trophies (35 in total).

Al Ain is by far the most successful club in the UAE. Al Ain has won a record 14 UAE Pro League, 7 President's Cups, 5 Super Cups, 3 Federation Cups, two League Cup, two Abu Dhabi Championship, Gulf Club Champions Cup and AFC Champions League. The club is the first and only UAE side so far to win the AFC Champions League.

History

Foundation and early years

In the early 1960s, a group of young men learned the rules of the game by watching British soldiers playing football and formed their own team. The first pitch was very simple and small, taking the shape of a square sandy plot of land on the main street near the Clock Roundabout in Al Ain.
In August 1968, the club was officially established, taking its name from the city they lived. The founders thought it was necessary to have a permanent headquarters for the club and rented a house on the current Khalifa Road for club meetings. The club's founders took responsibility for all the club's affairs, from planning the stadium to cleaning the club headquarters and washing the kit. Sheikh Khalifa bin Zayed Al Nahyan was approached for assistance and he provided the club  with a permanent headquarters in the Al Jahili district and a Land Rover to serve the club and the team. Al Ain made a successful debut by beating a team made up of British soldiers and went 
on to play friendly matches against other Abu Dhabi clubs. In 1971, the team played their first match against international opposition when they were defeated 7–0 by the Egyptian club Ismaily in a friendly match for the war effort.

In 1971, a group members of the club (Hadher Khalaf Al Muhairi, Saleem Al Khudrawi, Mohammed Khalaf Al Muhairi and Mahmoud Fadhlullah) broke away and founded Al Tadhamun Club. In 1971, Sheikh Khalifa bin Zayed Al Nahyan provided the club with new headquarters with modern specifications: the Khalifa Stadium in Al Sarooj district. In 1974 Al Ain combined with the breakaway Al Tadhamun, to form the Al Ain Sports Club. The first board of directors of the club was formed after the merger under the chairmanship Mohammed Salem Al Dhaheri.

The founders were Mohammed Saleh Bin Badooh and Khalifa Nasser Al Suwaidi, Saeed Bin Ghannoum Al Hameli, Abdullah Hazzam, Salem Hassan Al Muhairi, Abdullah and Mane'a Ajlan, Saeed Al Muwaisi, Nasser Dhaen, Abdullah Matar, Juma Al Najem, Ibrahim Al Mahmoud, Ibrahim Rasool and Ali Al Maloud and Ali Bu Majeed, who were the members of the Bahraini group of exchange students and Maamoun Abdulqader, Mahmoud Fadhlullah, Al Fateh Al Talib, Hussain Al Mirghani, Abbas Ali and Nasser, Abdullah Al Mansouri from the Sudanese and Saudi community working in the UAE.

First titles and Entry to the Football League (1974–1997)
On 2 February 1974, the club won its first title, the Abu Dhabi League. On 13 November 1974, Sheikh Khalifa was named honorary president of Al Ain, in recognition of his continuing support for the club. On 21 May 1975, Sheikh Sultan bin Zayed Al Nahyan was elected Chairman of Board of Directors. In 1975, Al Ain won its second Abu Dhabi League. In the same year on 21 March 1975, the club played its first UAE President Cup losing 4–5 on penalties in the Round of 16 against Al Shaab after drawing 1–1 in normal time. In 1975–76 season, the team participated for the first time in the UAE Football League, finishing runners-up behind Al Ahli. Al Ain won its first League title in the 1976–77 season, after drawing 1–1 with Al Sharjah in the last match. In the following season, they finished runners-up to Al Nasr; Mohieddine Habita was the top scorer with 20 goals. In the 1978–79 season, Al Ain secure third place with 27 points in the league and defeated by Sharjah in the President Cup final.

Mohammed Bin Zayed Al Nahyan became president of Al Ain on 19 January 1979. Al Ain won the League again in the 1980–81 season and lost the President Cup final to Al Shabab of Dubai. In 1983–84, the team won Joint League Cup and followed with its third League title, becoming the second with Al Ahli to have won the championship three times. The team had the strongest attack with 35 goals, and Ahmed Abdullah, with 20 goals was the joint-winner of the Arab League Golden Boot award for top scorer, alongside Al Wasl striker Fahad Khamees. This season was the first season in which foreign players were excluded from the UAE League, a restriction which was opposed by Al Ain. After winning the League title in 1983–84 season, Al Ain failed to win any trophies until 1989 when they won the Federation Cup. In the following year they reached the final of the President Cup, losing to Al Shabab.

The 1992–93 season began with several new signings: Saif Sultan (Ittihad Kalba), Salem Johar (Ajman), Saeed Juma (Emirates). Al Ain won their fourth League title with three games left to play, after a 5–0 win at Al Khaleej. In the following season, they finished second in the Football League and were runners-up the 1993 UAE Super Cup losing 2–1 against Al Shaab. They also reached the President Cup final but were beaten 1–0 by Al Shabab, failing for the fourth time to win the Cup. In 1994 and 1995, Al Ain lost two President Cup finals, finished second in the League, won the 1995 UAE Super Cup and lost out in the Asian Cup Winners' Cup second round to the Kuwaiti team Kazma. In the 1996–97 season, Al Ain were eliminated in the round of 16 of the President Cup by Hatta and finished fourth in the Football League.

The Golden Age (1997–2003)
Before the start of the 1997–98 season, the honorary board was formed on 7 June 1997. After this initiative, Al Ain won the league championship. In the following season, they won the President Cup and finished runner-up in the league and secured the third place  in their second appearance in Asian Club Championship, after the 1985. Ilie Balaci took charge in 1999. He led them to their sixth League championship, while in the Asian Cup Winners' Cup they were eliminated by Al Jaish on the away goals rule in the first round.

In 2003, Al Ain contested the AFC Champions League competition. In the Group stage they won all three matches, beating Al Hilal of Saudi Arabia, Al Sadd of Qatar and Esteghlal of Iran. In the semi-final they were matched against the Chinese side Dalian Shide over two legs.  In the first game, Al Ain won 4–2 at home, with Boubacar Sanogo scoring twice. In the return match in China Al Ain went 4–2 down with six minutes to play but won 7–6 on aggregate after a late goal by Farhad Majidi the Iranian legend. The final saw Al Ain face BEC Tero Sasana of Thailand.  In the home leg, Al Ain prevailed 2–0 with goals from Salem Johar and Mohammad Omar. At the Rajamangala Stadium on 11 October, Al Ain were beaten 1–0 by Tero Sasana, but won 2–1 on aggregate to become the first Emirati club to win the Champions League.

New Era (2016–present) 
In December 2018, Al Ain which celebrated the 50th anniversary participating in the 2018 FIFA Club World Cup, representing the host nation as the reigning champions of the UAE Pro-League. Al Ain beat Team Wellington from New Zealand in the first round and Espérance de Tunis of 2018 CAF Champions League champions to enter semifinal. On 18 December 2018, Al Ain defeated Copa Libertadores champions River Plate by penalties hosted in their home stadium Hazza Bin Zayed Stadium to enter the final for the first time in team history and became the first Emirati club to reach the decisive match. The final, on 22 December, Al Ain lost 4–1 to UEFA Champions League winners Real Madrid at the Zayed Sports City Stadium in Abu Dhabi.

Club rivalries

Abu Dhabi Classico

Crest and colours

Crests 
Al Jahili Fort is considered as a symbol of the club, because it reflects the history of the city and also was the formal home of Sheikh Zayed bin Sultan Al Nahyan since 1946 when he was a ruler's representative. It officially became a crest for the club in 1980.  They import a single star in their emblem because of their 2003 AFC Champions League victory.

Colours 
The team began playing in green and white in 1968. After merging with Al Tadhamon in 1974, their red colour became Al Ain's from season 1974–75 until the start of season 1976–77. During the first team training camp in Morocco in 1977, a friendly tournament was held by Moroccan club Wydad Casablanca with the Nice, Sporting CP, and Anderlecht. Al Ain admired Anderlecht's purple colors, and an idea came to change Al Ain's colors to purple. The idea was presented to Sheikh Hamdan bin Mubarak Al Nahyan, who agreed to change the club colors officially to the purple with the beginning of the season 1977–78.

Kit suppliers and shirt sponsors

Grounds

Al Ain first playground was set up on the main street near the Clock Roundabout in Al Ain. Took the shape of a square sandy plot of land. In 1971, Al Ain moved to new stadium in Al Sarouj district at a cost of £40,290. On 18 June 1978, the new stadium named after honorary president Khalifa Bin Zayed known as Sheikh Khalifa International Stadium. The stadium underwent a renovation in 2002 and increased its capacity to 12,000 people and as of the 2006–07 season all the Al Ain matches are played in this stadium. The stadium went through another significant upgrade and renovation, to prepare for the 2019 AFC Asian Cup, hosted in the UAE. As of 14 January 2014, Hazza Bin Zayed Stadium been Al Ain home ground.

Honours

34 official Championships.

Players

Unregistered players

Out on loan

Personnel

Current technical staff

{| class="wikitable"
|-
! style="color:#FFFFFF; background: #7300E6; border:2px solid #AB9767;"|Position
! style="color:#FFFFFF; background: #7300E6; border:2px solid #AB9767;"|Name
|-
|Head coach
| Serhiy Rebrov
|-
|Assistant coach
| Jassim Al-Kheybari Ahmed Abdullah
|-
|Assistant coach and analyst
| Abdulaziz Utbah
|-
|Fitness coach
| Ismail Al-Ghul 
|-
|Goalkeeping coach	
| Hussain Al-Ghanim  Nawaf Al-Marzouq
|-
|U-21 team head coach
| Saqr Al-Balushi
|-
|First and U21 team supervisor
|  Abdullah Al Shamsi

Management

Board of directors

Notes

Top goalscorers

Updated 22 August 2022.
Bold indicates player is still active at club level.

Note: this includes goals scored in all competitions.

Top scorers in Asian competitions
Since 2002–03 AFC Champions League, includes goals scored in qualifying play-offStatistics correct as of match played against Al Nassr on 24 September 2020

Asian

Overview
 Legend: GF = Goals For. GA = Goals Against. GD = Goal Difference.

Participations
 QS : Qualifying Stage, GS : Group Stage, R16 : Round of 16,  QF : Quarterfinals, SF : Semifinal, R : Runner-up, C : Champions

References

External links

 Official Al-Ain FC website
 Al Ain FC on Arabian Gulf League official website
 Al Ain FC on AFC official website

 
Association football clubs established in 1968
1968 establishments in the Trucial States
Football clubs in the Emirate of Abu Dhabi
Ain
Multi-sport clubs in the United Arab Emirates
AFC Champions League winning clubs